Del Norte International Airport is an airport located in General Escobedo, Nuevo León, working as a secondary airport for Mexico's second largest city, Monterrey.

History

Del Norte was created by American Airlines around the 1940s, when they wanted to start service to Monterrey but there was no airport available. After a number of incidents regarding arrival procedures into Del Norte (A notorious one being Mexicana de Aviación Flight 704's accident in June 1969) and increasing traffic forced authorities to build another airport, General Mariano Escobedo International Airport. Around the airport, visitors can still see some old AA letters on the inside of some selected hangars.

Facilities

It is composed of 123 hangars, mainly private, a control tower, two runways, one of 2.000 m and the other is of 1.500 m, and a terminal building with all the facilities for commercial services, including a state-of-the-art concourse with 2 jetbridges and 2 more boarding gates.
The airport is mainly used for pilot-training and private use, also this airport hosts the Center of Investigation, Innovation in Aeronautic Engineering from the Autonomous University of Nuevo León 

As of September 14, 2007, the Airport has upgraded Runway 20 with an ILS/DME.

References

External links

 

Airports in Nuevo León
Transportation in Monterrey